Baron Gainford, of Headlam in the County Palatine of Durham, is a title in the Peerage of the United Kingdom. It was created on 3 January 1917 for the Liberal politician Jack Pease, a member of the Darlington Pease family. He notably served as President of the Board of Education from 1911 to 1915. Pease was the second son of Sir Joseph Pease, 1st Baronet, and the grandson of Joseph Pease, while Arthur Pease was his uncle and Sir Arthur Pease, 1st Baronet, Beaumont Pease, 1st Baron Wardington, and Herbert Pease, 1st Baron Daryngton, were his first cousins. The third baron was a former member of the London County Council and of the Greater London Council.  the title is held by his younger brother, the fourth baron, an architect and town planner; County Planning Officer for Ross and Cromarty 1967–1975 and Scottish Office Inquiry Reporter 1978–1993.

Baron Gainford (1917)
 Joseph Albert "Jack" Pease, 1st Baron Gainford (1860–1943)
 Joseph Pease, 2nd Baron Gainford (1889–1971)
 Joseph Edward Pease, 3rd Baron Gainford (1921–2013)
 George Pease, 4th Baron Gainford (1926–2022)
 Adrian Christopher Pease, 5th Baron Gainford (b. 1960)

The heir presumptive to the barony is the present holder's brother, Hon. Matthew Edward Pease (b. 1962).

The heir presumptive's heir apparent is his eldest son, Felix George Pease (b. 1992), followed by his brother, Silas John Pease (b. 1999).

See also
 Pease Baronets, of Hutton Lowcross and Pinchinthorpe
 Pease Baronets, of Hammersknott
 Baron Daryngton
 Pease family of Darlington

References

Source
 
 Kidd, Charles, Williamson, David (editors). Debrett's Peerage and Baronetage (1990 edition). New York: St Martin's Press, 1990.
 

Baronies in the Peerage of the United Kingdom
Noble titles created in 1917
Noble titles created for UK MPs
Pease family